Mannar may refer to the following places:

India
 Mannar, Alappuzha, a town in Chengannur Taluk, Kerala

Sri Lanka
 Mannar District, one of 25 districts in Sri Lanka
 Mannar Island, an island within the district
Mannar Bridge, a bridge connecting the island to the mainland
 Mannar, Sri Lanka, a large town on the island 
 Mannar Electoral District, an historical electoral district between 1947 and 1989
Mannar line, railway line which runs onto the island via a separate bridge

See also

 Gulf of Mannar, the sea between India and Sri Lanka
Mannar massacre (disambiguation)
 Mannargudi, a town in Tamil Nadu, India
Mannar Vagaiyara, a 2018 film